Forcalquier Cathedral, now the Church of Notre-Dame-du-Bourguet, is a former Roman Catholic cathedral, and a national monument of France, located in the town of Forcalquier, Alpes-de-Haute-Provence.

Erected in the 12th century as a collegiate church, the cathedral of Forcalquier became a second seat of the Bishop of Sisteron in 1408, and for that reason is referred to as a co-cathedral. The diocese of Sisteron was abolished in 1801, after which the cathedral continued as a parish church.

The nave, the choir, the transept and the cloister date from the early 13th century, representing one of the first examples of Gothic style in southern France. The bell tower is from the 16th century. The church houses a panel of the Triumph of Christ by Pierre Mignard.

References

Further reading
 Noël Didier, 1954: Les églises de Sisteron et de Forcalquier du XIe siècle à la Révolution. Le problème de la concathédralité. Dalloz: Paris
 Parc naturel du Luberon: Autour de l’An Mil en pays de Forcalquier. Exhibition catalogue 2007
 Raymond Collier, 1986: La Haute-Provence monumentale et artistique, p.529. Digne: Imprimerie Louis Jean
 Trait d'union : bulletin de la ville de Forcalquier, No 21 (Nov 2008), p. 15

External links
Location
Picture of the cathedral organ
Picture of the cathedral façade

Former cathedrals in France
Churches in Alpes-de-Haute-Provence
12th-century Roman Catholic church buildings in France